The East Frisian Report is a 1973 German sex comedy and road film directed by Walter Boos.

Theme
Despite its title, Der Ostfriesen-Report is not a sex report film but a Bavarian sex comedy film bringing in elements from East Frisian jokes. Shot mainly in and around Neßmersiel, the film brings two popular German regional stereotypes (Bavarians vs. East Frisians) together. The film was sometimes known as Swedish Playgirls, despite the fact it is set in Germany rather than Sweden. It was followed by a loose sequel Revenge of the East Frisians in 1974.

Plot
A Munich night club owned by East Frisian Ossi Jansen is in decline. He commissions two hardheaded Bavarians, night club director Alois Mooser and his raunchy wife Lisa to travel to East Frisia and recruit fresh girls.

Cast

References

External links

1970s sex comedy films
German sex comedy films
West German films
German comedy road movies
1970s comedy road movies
Films set in Munich
Films set in West Germany
Films directed by Walter Boos
1970s German-language films
Constantin Film films
1970s German films